5th Fleet: Modern Naval Combat in the Indian Ocean is a board game published in 1989 by Victory Games.

Contents
5th Fleet is a game in which modern naval combat in the Indian Ocean and Persian Gulf is covered at the operational level.

Reception
Mike Siggins reviewed 5th Fleet for Games International magazine, and gave it a rating of 9 out of 10, and stated that "I feel Joe Balkoski has again struck a workable balance between playability and realism, probably the most difficult of all design tasks, while still providing enough detail and atmosphere to satisfy all but the rivet-counters."

References

Board games introduced in 1989
Victory Games